Edna Grossman (born Edna Kalka) is an American mathematician. She was born in Germany, grew up in Brooklyn, New York, and graduated with a B.S. in mathematics from Brooklyn College. She earned her M.S. in mathematics from New York University's Courant Institute of Mathematical Sciences, where she also received her Ph.D. in mathematics in 1972; her thesis, supervised by Wilhelm Magnus, concerned the symmetries of free groups. Grossman worked for IBM, where she was part of the team that designed and analyzed the Data Encryption Standard. She is known for her development, along with Bryant Tuckerman, of the first slide attack in cryptanalysis.

References

20th-century American mathematicians
21st-century American mathematicians
American cryptographers
American women mathematicians
Group theorists
Brooklyn College alumni
Courant Institute of Mathematical Sciences alumni
Living people
Year of birth missing (living people)
20th-century women mathematicians
21st-century women mathematicians
20th-century American women
21st-century American women